Volegovo is a rural locality (a passing loop) in Vereshchaginsky District, Perm Krai, Russia. The population was 11 as of 2010.

Geography 
Volegovo is located 33 km southwest of Vereshchagino (the district's administrative centre) by road. Nizhniye Garevskiye is the nearest rural locality.

References 

Rural localities in Vereshchaginsky District